The Newton Centre Branch Library is a historic library building at 1294 Centre Street in Newton, Massachusetts.  The building now houses municipal offices.  (A new library building opened near city hall in 1991.)  The -story brick building was designed by Newton resident James Ritchie of Ritchie, Parsons & Tyler, and was built in 1928.  It was one of five branch libraries paid for by subscription of Newton citizens and built between 1926 and 1939.  The building is basically Tudor Revival in its styling, although its entry has a Colonial Revival segmented arch surround.

The building was listed on the National Register of Historic Places in 1990.

See also
 Waban Branch Library
 Plummer Memorial Library in Auburndale
 National Register of Historic Places listings in Newton, Massachusetts

References

Library buildings completed in 1927
National Register of Historic Places in Newton, Massachusetts
Libraries on the National Register of Historic Places in Massachusetts
Libraries established in 1927
Libraries in Newton, Massachusetts
Libraries in Middlesex County, Massachusetts
Former library buildings in the United States